Augustus Dorner (August 18, 1876 in Chambersburg, Pennsylvania – May 4, 1956 in Chambersburg, Pennsylvania), was a professional baseball player who played pitcher in the Major Leagues from -. He played for the Boston Beaneaters, Cincinnati Reds, and Cleveland Naps.

References

1876 births
1956 deaths
Major League Baseball pitchers
Baseball players from Pennsylvania
Boston Beaneaters players
Boston Doves players
Cincinnati Reds players
Cleveland Bronchos players
Cleveland Naps players
Minor league baseball managers
Decatur Commodores players
Columbus Senators players
Kansas City Blues (baseball) players
Wilkes-Barre Barons (baseball) players
Harrisburg Senators players